Morgan Thomas (15 December 1824 – 8 March 1903) was a Welsh-Australian surgeon and public benefactor.

Thomas was born in Wales. He qualified for the medical profession and came to Adelaide in 1851. He was appointed first house surgeon to the Adelaide hospital and practised at Nairne and Adelaide. He retired about 1870 and except for occasional trips to Europe and America, lived in Adelaide for the rest of his life. He had inherited property in Wales, and invested his money judiciously in bank and other shares. A much respected man of regular and precise habits, he spent much of his time at the Adelaide public library. He died at Adelaide on 8 March 1903. Under his will about £65,000 was left to the public library, museum and art gallery at Adelaide.

References

Morgan, E. J. R. Thomas, Morgan (1824–1903), Australian Dictionary of Biography, Volume 6, Melbourne University Press, 1976, p. 263.

1824 births
1903 deaths
Australian surgeons
Australian philanthropists
19th-century philanthropists